Jack E. Leonard (born Leonard Lebitsky; April 24, 1910 – May 10, 1973) was an American comedian and actor who made frequent appearances on television variety and game shows.

Biography
Leonard was born Leonard Lebitsky on April 24, 1910, in Chicago (“You know, the city where kids play robbers and robbers”), the son of a Jewish tailor. He claimed that one of his childhood friends was Baby Face Nelson. As a young man, he worked as a lifeguard (“I swam against Johnny Weissmuller ... and he was so fast I haven't seen him since”), and first worked professionally as a dancer, competing in Charleston contests. In the 1930s, he joined a vaudeville troupe, then began touring with the big bands, playing nightclubs all over the country. During World War II he toured bases with the United Service Organizations.

The Tonight Show, hosted by Jack Paar, marked his first national exposure.  For the next several years he worked steadily in Las Vegas, and made hundreds of television appearances on various panel and variety shows. He made occasional recordings, and appeared in a handful of motion pictures, such as Three Sailors and a Girl.

Leonard's comedic method was sarcastic and aggressive, creating an "insult humor" genre which anticipated Don Rickles. (Leonard was roastmaster at the Friars' Club roast of Rickles, who he introduced as "a man who's been doing my act for about 12 years now.") A trademark line, after taking off his hat to reveal his bald head: "What did you expect, feathers?" He also referenced his weight problem in his act. Leonard's strong and unapologetic onstage personality ("Good evening, opponents!") belied a gentle and giving spirit that would occasionally be revealed in his act when he would sing a sentimental song.

He wore a distinctive outfit: a dark suit, purposely two sizes too small, a white narrow-brimmed hat, and horn-rimmed glasses. On one variety show, Leonard's contemporaneous popularity was demonstrated when a lookalike came on stage and did a Leonard-like schtick. Then Leonard walked on stage and addressed his doppelgänger: "You've got a great future, son, but not in this business!"

In March 1973, he collapsed shortly after finishing a performance at the Rainbow Room in New York City and underwent emergency cardiac bypass surgery, but died several weeks later at age 63.

Discography
 Rock and Roll for Kids Over Sixteen (1957) Vik LX-1080 mono
 How to Lose Weight with Fat Jack (1964)
 Scream on Someone You Love Today (1967)

Partial filmography
 Three Sailors and a Girl (1953) – Porky
 The Disorderly Orderly (1964) – Fat Jack
 The World of Abbott and Costello (1965) – Narrator (compilation of clips from Abbott and Costello movies)
 The Dictator's Guns (1965) – Keefer
 The Fat Spy (1966) – Irving / Herman Gonjular (Twins)
 A Man Called Adam (1966) – Himself, Party Guest (uncredited)
 Target: Harry (1969) – Valdez
 Journey Back to Oz (1972) – The Signpost (voice) (final film role)

References

External links
 
 Radiotapes.com Aircheck of Jack E. Leonard on WLOL-AM Radio (Minneapolis) from approximately 1960

1910 births
1973 deaths
American male comedians
Male actors from Chicago
Jewish American male actors
Jewish American comedians
20th-century American male actors
Comedians from Illinois
Jewish American male comedians
20th-century American comedians
20th-century American Jews